The Young Hoosier Book Award (YHBA) is an annual book award given by the Indiana Library Federation. It is divided into three categories: Picture Books (kindergarten through second grade), Intermediate (third through fifth grade), and Middle Grade (sixth through eighth grade). It encourages self-selected reading among elementary and middle school/junior high school children. Indiana students vote for their favorite among the 20 nominees in each category.

It gave its first award in 1975, to "Trumpet of the Swan" by E.B. White. The most recent winners (2019–2020) were "The Legend of Rock, Paper, Scissors" by Drew Daywalt (Picture Book), "Restart" by Gordon Korman (Intermediate), and "Refugee" by Alan Gratz (Middle Grades).

References

American literary awards